Metal theft in the United Kingdom is the systematic and organised theft of high-value metal (mostly copper) in the United Kingdom.

History
Metal theft in the UK is largely the responsibility of the British Transport Police (BTP). Metal recycling traders can be traced by Trading Standards, regulated by the Chartered Trading Standards Institute. Most metal theft in the UK is classed as non-domestic burglary.

In 2006, the price of copper significantly increased by three times, and the spates of copper theft from railway signaling increased significantly. Operation Tremor was implemented by the BTP and Network Rail to counteract the spates of theft.

In the year to March 2016, according to the ONS, there were 16,155 metal theft offences across the UK's 42 police forces, a significant decrease of 38% over the previous year. In England and Wales there were 3 metal theft offences per 10,000 population. North East England has the highest rate of metal theft - 7 per 10,000 population. Information on metal theft is available at the Home Office Data Hub, run on CKAN (created by the Open Knowledge International at the University of Cambridge).

Sources of metal

Church roofs Church roofs have been stripped of the lead roof, forcing some into near bankruptcy. Replacing church roofs is prohibitively expensive.
Electricity substations Copper conductor has been taken from electricity substations. 
Railway signalling cables Copper cable for signalling alongside railway lines has been removed, known as cable theft.
Telephone cables Telephone communication cables are made of copper, and some villages have been completely disconnected from the BT telephone network by thieves.
Automotive catalytic converters Catalytic converters contain valuable metals (platinum and rhodium) and can be stolen easily from some makes of automobiles when parked. Vehicles can be targeted for theft based on amount of valuable metal and ease of removal of converter.

Prevention
Metal recycling in the UK is largely regulated by the British Metals Recycling Association trade association. Police investigations into the thefts have included Operation Crucible and Operation Tremor.

See also

 Criminal damage in English law
 Route crime
 Theft Act 1968

References

External links
 British Transport Police

British Transport Police
Copper
Fraud in the United Kingdom
Lead
Metal theft
Organised crime in the United Kingdom
Railway signalling in the United Kingdom